Misandao is a fried cake glazed in malt sugar and is a traditional dish of Xuzhou cuisine.

Preparation
The basic ingredients to this dish are flour, baking soda, and vegetable oil. About 25% of the flour would be mixed with water, baking soda, and malt sugar for fermentation, and this is the outside skin. The remaining flour would be mixed evenly with water and this is the inner part. Both types of dough would be compressed into rectangular shapes and stacked. The sandwiched dough would then be compressed thinner and cut into long strips, and then folded and cut three times into 4 equal parts. The resulting dough pieces would then be fried in vegetable oil. Once the fried dough pieces are taken out, they are dipped in malt sugar and then served.

The origin of the name is said to come from Su dong po, who named it when it was served soon after he had made three cuts into a wall with a knife in a moment of revelry.

Misandao is also the name of a Chinese punk band, named after the confection.

References 

Beijing cuisine
Chinese desserts